The Canadian Scientific Research and Experimental Development Tax Incentive Program (SRED or SR&ED) provides support in the form of tax credits and/or refunds, to corporations, partnerships or individuals who conduct scientific research or experimental development in Canada.

Background

Industrial tax incentives in Canada have been in place since at least 1944. A 1989 report prepared by Odette Madore, Govt of Canada Economics Division, summarizes the history of R&D tax policy. 
1944-1986 - traditional tax deductions for R&D, introduced R&D tax credits,
1987-1993 - mitigated abuses and simplified administration
1994–present - clarified definition of experimental development, broadened eligibility re Qualified Small Businesses, allowed proxy calculation for overhead, conducted major review in 1998, simplified forms, conducted major review in 2010
Oct 2011 The Canadian government commissioned an expert panel to conduct a comprehensive Review of Federal Support to Research and Development.

The SR&ED program is intended to encourage businesses of all sizes, particularly small to medium and start-up firms, to conduct research and development (R&D) that will lead to new, improved, or technologically advanced products, processes, devices, and materials.  The Canadian SR&ED tax incentive is the government's largest single support program for R&D. Canada has one of the more generous R&D programs among OECD countries.

"Each year the SR&ED program provides over $4 billion in investment tax credits (ITCs) to over 18,000 claimants. Of these, about 75% are small businesses." (CRA RC4472) An expert panel appointed by the federal government recently recommended that the federal government consider redirecting some of the funds allocated to the SR&ED program to ensure that enough supports exist for larger businesses interested in taking innovations to the global market place. The SR&ED program produces less of an incentive as firms grow, since the maximum benefit any single firm can receive from the program is fixed, and not proportional to firm size.

SR&ED expenditures are deducted as business expenses, and may also qualify for investment tax credits that are received in the form of a reduction in income taxes payable, cash refunds, or both. Qualifying expenditures may include wages, expenditures for materials, equipment leases and overhead that are directly related to R&D, and 80% of the cost of eligible work by contractors. Capital equipment and equipment lease expenditures made after 1 January 2014, are not eligible. The following activities constitute SR&ED:
 Experimental development - technological advancement
 Applied research - advancement of knowledge for a practical purpose
 Basic research - advancement of knowledge for its own sake
 Eligible support work: engineering, design, operations research, mathematical analysis, computer programming, data collection, testing and psychological research

The following activities are not eligible for the SR&ED program: marketing & sales, routine testing, research in social sciences or humanities, commercial production, style changes, routine data collection, petroleum or natural gas exploration/drilling.

In order to claim such expenditures, an assessment on scientific or technological eligibility of the claimed activities needs to be performed, according to three criteria:

 Scientific or technological uncertainty: Technological obstacles / uncertainties are the technological problems or unknowns that cannot be overcome by applying the techniques, procedures and data that are generally accessible to competent professionals in the field.
 Scientific and technical content: A systematic investigation entails going from identification and articulation of the scientific or technological obstacles/uncertainties, hypothesis formulation, through testing by experimentation or analysis, to the statement of logical conclusions. In a business context, this requires that the objectives of the scientific research or experimental development work must be clearly stated at an early stage in the evolution of the project, and the method of addressing the scientific or technological obstacle/uncertainty by experimentation or analysis must be clearly set out.
 Scientific or technological advancement: The search carried out in the experimental development activity must generate information that advances your understanding of the underlying technologies. In a business context, this means that when a new or improved material, device, product or process is created, it must embody a technological advancement in order to be eligible. In other words, the work must attempt to increase the technology base or level from where it was at the beginning of the project.

The Department of Finance is responsible for the legislation that governs the SR&ED program. The Income Tax Act defines SR&ED. The Canada Revenue Agency (CRA) is responsible for its administration. The CRA Information Circular 86-4R3 is a key document that provides technical guidelines to clarify and interpret the language in the tax act. CRA Interpretation Bulletin IT-151-R4 is a key document that explains SR&ED expenditures.

Investment Tax Credit
Federally, the maximum Investment Tax Credit (ITC) depends on the company's legal status and amount of qualified expenditures for SR&ED carried out in Canada.
 Canadian-controlled private corporation (CCPC): the ITC is 35% of the first $3 million in qualified expenditures, and 15% on any excess amount.
 Other Canadian corporations, proprietorships, partnerships, and trusts: the ITC is 15% of all qualified expenditures.

In addition, each province or territory may also provide provincial or territorial tax credits (subject to a cap) to qualifying corporations carrying out SR&ED in their respective province or territory:

Provinces and territories may offer alternative or supplemental investment programs.  Examples:
 Alberta offers funding through its science and research investments grant program.
 Prince Edward Island offers grants (non-repayable contributions) under various funds.
 Northwest Territories and Nunavut provide a 15% tax credit under the Risk Capital Investment Tax Credits Act.

Changes to Form T661
For tax years ending after 31 December 2008, CRA will only accept the new 2008 version of the Form T661. Significant changes include modifications to the “Part 2 project information” section that details the scientific and technological aspects of the SR&ED projects claimed, which has been restructured from free-flowing questions to a direct question format.

In 2010, the CRA made minor revisions to Form T661 (10), to clarify some of the instructions and move the expenditure summaries from T661 Part 2 to a new summary section, T661 Part 6.

In 2013, The CRA made additional changes to the T661, where Consultants are now required to provide their agreement and the amount they charge to clients in return for filing claims on their behalf.

Self-Assessment and Learning Tool (SALT)
The SALT is CRA’s web-based tool that is used to determine through a series of concise questions if work performed has a likelihood of meeting SR&ED requirements for funding. The SALT is mainly intended for potential claimants in the small to medium business sector, and for those who are new to the SR&ED program. SALT is an enhanced version of the previous tool, ESAT (Eligibility Self‑assessment Tool).

The SR&ED Application Process

Canada Revenue Agency (CRA) and corresponding provincial tax authorities require all SR&ED claimants to submit their claim no later than 18 months after the effective fiscal year. For example, for a claimant with a fiscal year ending on December 31, 2018, it is required that the requisite documents are submitted no later than June 30, 2020. With that being said, CRA encourages taxpayers to submit their claims within a six-month time frame post-fiscal year-end, alongside their annual filings, because processing times for SR&ED tend to be much faster. In fact, if submitted within six months post-fiscal year, CRA reports a 60-day turnaround for complete claims. Claimants who submit incomplete claims can expect longer processing times.

Some firms are in need of their SR&ED refund far sooner than the CRA can process their claim, therefore public and private lenders provide financing solutions to claimants. Public lenders tend to shape their financing terms on a firm's short-term and long-term assets, while private lenders will focus primarily on the firm's history with the SR&ED program, as well as the quality and strength of the claim in question. Given that the claim is secured by an anticipated receipt of a tax credit, firms can receive financing for both pre-file and post-file claims.

After submitting a SR&ED claim, the group within the CRA processes the claim on a technical and financial basis. Technical reviewers are primarily concerned with determining whether the project meets the definition of SR&ED, while the financial reviewers focus on the eligibility of associated expenditures expressed in Canadian salaries, subcontractor fees, materials, and overhead. It is possible for a claimant to be reviewed or audited on the basis of technical or financial weaknesses. In either case, the claimant bears the burden of proof and is given an opportunity to defend their claim.

Given the possibility of review or audit by CRA, claimants are strongly encouraged to keep contemporaneous documentation that proves the advancement in a given area of science or technology, as well as associated expenditures. Contemporaneous documentation assumes that eligible SR&ED work is documented at the time the work was conducted. Retroactively documenting eligible SR&ED work is highly discouraged and increases a taxpayer's risk of having a claim reduced or even outright rejected. Examples of contemporaneous documentation include:

 Project planning documents
 Documents on design of experiments
 Experimentation plan
 Design documents and technical drawings
 Project records, laboratory notebooks
 Design, system architecture and source code (software development)
 Records of trial runs
 Project progress reports
 Minutes of project meetings
 Test protocols, data, results, analysis and conclusions
 Final project report or professional publication
 Photographs, videos
 Prototypes, samples
 Scrap, scrap records
 Contracts, lease agreements
 Records of resources allocated to the project, time sheets, activity records, payroll records
 Purchase invoices and proof of payment
 Accounting records

See also
 Industrial Research Assistance Program
 Western Economic Diversification Canada

References

External links
 Scientific Research and Experimental Development Tax Incentive Program
 Income Tax Act
 CRA Information for First-Time Claimants
 CRA Form T661
 CRA Sample Completed Form T661
 CRA T4088: Guide to Form T661
 CRA Field of science or technology codes for Form T661
 CRA Sector-specific guides
 ESAT
 Impact of the 2012 Federal Budget on SR&ED, Innovation Funding and Startups
Impact of the 2013 Federal Budget on SR&ED, Innovation Funding and Startups

Tax credits
Taxation in Canada